Reuben J. Phillips (July 28, 1874 – February 8, 1936) was a United States marine serving during the Boxer Rebellion who received the Medal of Honor for bravery.

Biography
Phillips was born July 28, 1874, in Cambria, California and enlisted into the Marine Corps from Mare Island, California July 16, 1898. After entering the Marine Corps he was sent to fight in the Chinese Boxer Rebellion.

He received the Medal for his actions in China on 13 and 20–22 June 1900 and it was presented to him July 19, 1901.

He was discharged from the Marine Corps on July 21, 1903, at the rank of sergeant. He died February 8, 1936, and is buried in San Francisco National Cemetery, San Francisco, California.

Medal of Honor citation
Rank and organization: Corporal, U.S. Marine Corps. Born: 28 July 1874, Cambria, Calif. Accredited to: California. G.O. No.: 55, 19 July 1901.

Citation:

In action with the relief expedition of the Allied forces in China during the battles of 13, 20, 21 and 22 June 1900. Throughout this period and in the presence of the enemy, Phillips distinguished himself by meritorious conduct.

See also

List of Medal of Honor recipients
List of Medal of Honor recipients for the Boxer Rebellion

References

External links

1874 births
1936 deaths
United States Marine Corps Medal of Honor recipients
United States Marines
American military personnel of the Boxer Rebellion
People from San Luis Obispo County, California
Boxer Rebellion recipients of the Medal of Honor
Burials at San Francisco National Cemetery